Fish measurement is the measuring of individual fish and various parts of their anatomies. These data are used in many areas of ichthyology, including taxonomy and fisheries biology.

Overall length
 Standard length (SL) is the length of a fish measured from the tip of the snout to the posterior end of the last vertebra or to the posterior end of the midlateral portion of the hypural plate. Simply put, this measurement excludes the length of the caudal (tail) fin.
 Total length (TL) is the length of a fish measured from the tip of the snout to the tip of the longer lobe of the caudal fin, usually measured with the lobes compressed along the midline. It is a straight-line measure, not measured over the curve of the body.

Standard length measurements are used with Teleostei (most bony fish), while total length measurements are used with Myxini (hagfish), Petromyzontiformes (lampreys), and (usually) Elasmobranchii (sharks and rays), as well as some other fishes.

Total length measurements are used in slot limit and minimum landing size regulations.

In addition, fishery biologists often use a third measure in fishes with forked tails:

 Fork length (FL) is the length of a fish measured from the tip of the snout to the end of the middle caudal fin rays, and is used in fishes in which it is difficult to tell where the vertebral column ends.

Fin lengths and eye diameter
Other possible measurements include the lengths of various fins, the lengths of fin bases and the diameter of the eye.

See also
Ichthyology terms
 Standard weight in fish

References

External links
Diagram of fish measurements - Florida Museum of Natural History Ichthyology Department

Ichthyology
Fishkeeping
Fish anatomy
Fisheries science